Moonrock may refer to:

Moon rock, rocks from the moon
"Moon Rock", a song by Laurel Aitken
"Moon Rock", a song from Huncho Jack, Jack Huncho by Travis Scott and Quavo
"Moon Rocks", a song from the Talking Heads album Speaking in Tongues
Moonrock, a character in the American animated TV series The Pebbles and Bamm-Bamm Show